Kouign-amann (kouignoù-amann) is a sweet Breton cake, made with laminated dough.  It is a round multi-layered cake, originally made with bread dough (nowadays sometimes viennoiserie dough), containing layers of butter and incorporated sugar, similar in fashion to puff pastry, albeit with fewer layers. The cake is slowly baked until the sugar caramelizes and the recipe's butter (in fact the steam of the 20 percent water in the butter) expands the dough, resulting in its layered structure. A smaller version, “kouignette”, is similar to a muffin-shaped, caramelized croissant.

A specialty of the town of Douarnenez in Finistère, Brittany, where it originated around 1860, the pastry is attributed to Yves-René Scordia (1828–1878).

The name comes from the Breton language words for cake (kouign) and butter (amann), and in 2011 the New York Times described the kouign-amann as "the fattiest pastry in all of Europe."

Recipe 

The strict original Douarnenez recipe requires a ratio of 40 percent dough, 30 percent butter, and 30 percent sugar. Traditionally, kouign-amann is baked as a large cake and served in slices, although recently, especially in North America, individual cupcake-sized pastries (kouignettes) have become more popular.

Popularity 
The kouign-amann has been a staple pastry at many Japanese bakeries after becoming popular in the late 1990s.

In 2014, episode 7 of series 5 of the BBC's The Great British Bake Off featured the kouign-amann. In 2015, notable bakeries in New York, Washington D.C., Boston, Salt Lake City, and San Francisco began to sell the pastry. In Denver, several bakeries offer varieties; some shorten the name to "queen".

See also
 List of butter dishes
 List of cakes

References

External links

Kouign amann: some history 
Recipe for kouign-amann: an easy recipe on how to make kouign-amanns at home

Breton cuisine
Foods featuring butter
French cakes
French desserts
French pastries
Pancakes
Pastries